Kadie-Ann Dehaney (born 4 September 1996 in Kingston, Jamaica) is a Jamaican netball player who plays for the Sunshine Coast Lightning in the Suncorp Super Netball league. She has also represented the Jamaica national netball team.

Early life
Dehaney was born in Kingston, Jamaica. She started her netball career at Melrose Junior High School and St Hughes High School before attending Mico University College.

Career
Dehaney made her international netball debut in the 2015 Netball World Cup against Samoa. She participated at the 2013 Netball World Youth Cup in Glasgow, Scotland where the Jamaicans finished in third place. She also captained the under-21 Sunshine Girls at the 2017 Netball World Youth Cup in Gaborone, Botswana whereby the team finished in fifth place. In 2015, she earned the MVP award in the Berger Elite League final whereby her team, the Clarendon Gators defeated the St James Sharpes. That following year, she earned a spot in the Sunshine Girls squad to the 2015 Netball World Cup. In 2017, she was signed by the Australian-based team the Melbourne Vixens in the Suncorp Super Netball.

References

Jamaican netball players
Melbourne Vixens players
1996 births
Living people
Sportspeople from Kingston, Jamaica
2019 Netball World Cup players
Jamaican expatriate netball people in Australia
Suncorp Super Netball players
Sunshine Coast Lightning players
Commonwealth Games medallists in netball
Commonwealth Games silver medallists for Jamaica
Netball players at the 2022 Commonwealth Games
Medallists at the 2022 Commonwealth Games